The 1968 Utah State Aggies football team was an American football team that represented Utah State University as an independent during the 1968 NCAA University Division football season. In their second season under head coach Chuck Mills, the Aggies compiled a 7–3 record and outscored all opponents by a total of 247 to 142.

The team's statistical leaders included John Pappas with 1,647 passing yards, Altie Taylor with 929 rushing yards and 72 points scored, Mike O'Shea with 1,077 receiving yards, and Dana Schulz with 131 total tackles.

Schedule

References

Utah State
Utah State Aggies football seasons
Utah State Aggies football